Beaton Creek is a tributary of the Columbia River in the Canadian province of British Columbia.

Course
Beaton Creek flows generally northwest into Beaton Arm and Upper Arrow Lake, part of the Columbia River.

See also
List of British Columbia rivers
Tributaries of the Columbia River

References

Rivers of British Columbia
Tributaries of the Columbia River
Kootenay Land District